Joshua Franco (born October 27, 1995) is an American professional boxer who has held the WBA super flyweight title since 2020.

Professional career

Early career
Franco made his professional debut on August 6, 2015, scoring a four-round split decision (SD) victory over Temoatzin Landeros at the Belasco Theater in Los Angeles, California. He amassed a 14-1 record during the next three years, with six of those victories coming by way of stoppage.

Franco was scheduled to challenge Oscar Negrete for the WBC-NABF bantamweight title on October 4, 2018 at The Hangar in Costa Mesa, California. The bout was set as the main event of an ESPN2 and ESPN Deportes broadcast card. The fight, in which both men threw over 1000 punches, was ruled a split draw. Each fighter received a 96–94 scorecard from one of the judges, while the third judge scored the fight a 95–95 draw. An immediate rematch between the pair was set, with the WBC-NABF and vacant WBA International bantamweight titles on the line. The rematch was scheduled for April 25, 2019, as the co-main event of a junior welterweight bout between Yves Ulysse Jr. and Steve Claggett, and was broadcast by DAZN. Franco won the fight by split decision, with one score of 98-92 for Negrete and 96-94 and 97-93 for Franco. Franco made the first defense of his two secondary title against Oscar Negrete on August 10, 2019. The trilogy bout was scheduled as the co-main event of a welterweight fight between Vergil Ortiz Jr. and Antonio Orozco. Franco and Negrete once again fought to a split decision draw, with scores of 96–94, 95–95 and 93–96, the same as in their first meeting.

Franco was scheduled to face Jose Alejandro Burgos in a non-title bout on January 11, 2020, on a DAZN broadcast card. Franco moved back down to super flyweight from bantamweight for this bout. He won the fight by a ninth-round technical knockout.

WBA super flyweight champion

The Moloney trilogy 
After compiling a record of 16–1–2 (8 KOs) he challenged WBA (Regular) super flyweight champion, Andrew Moloney, on June 23, 2020 at the MGM Grand in Paradise, Nevada. After a competitive back-and-forth fight in which Franco scored a knockdown in the eleventh round, he defeated Moloney via twelve-round unanimous decision (UD) to capture the WBA (Regular) title. Two judges scored the bout 114–113 while the third scored it 115–112, with the eleventh-round knockdown being the deciding factor in Franco's victory; had he not scored the knockdown, Moloney would have retained his title through a majority draw. According to CompuBox stats, Franco landed 231 out of 789 (29.3%) punches thrown while Moloney landed 191 out of 663 (28.8%).

The pair agreed to fight an immediate rematch on November 14, 2020, at the MGM Grand Conference Center in Paradise, Nevada, on the undercard of the Terence Crawford and Kell Brook welterweight title bout. Referee Russell Mora declared the fight a no contest, after the ringside doctor stopped the fight at the beginning of the third round due to a swelling around Franco's right eye, which resulted from a headbutt according to the referee. Moloney's corner disputed this, which led to a 20 minute instant replay review by the NSAC who confirmed Mora's decision.

Due to the controversial nature of their second meeting, a trilogy bout was scheduled for August 14, 2021, which took place at the Hard Rock Hotel & Casino in Tulsa, Oklahoma. The title fight was set as the main event of an ESPN broadcast card, with most odds-makers having Moloney as the favorite at -240. Franco retained the title by unanimous decision, with all three judges awarding him a 116–112 scorecard. He outlanded Moloney 168 to 107 in total punches, and 127 to 73 in power punches landed.

Promotion to undisputed champion
On February 9, 2022, the WBA ordered the WBA "Super" champion Juan Francisco Estrada to defend his title against Franco. The pair were given until March 11 to come to terms. As the pair failed to do so, a purse bid was scheduled for April 18, 2022, which was later postponed by 24 hours. The promotional rights were won by Golden Boy Promotions, who bid $120,000, with a 75/25 split in favor of Estrada. Although the bout was officially expected to take place on July 16, 2022, it was eventually postponed to August 20. On July 18, Estrada's trainer Alfredo Caballero stated in an interview with Izquierdazo that Estrada would vacate the WBA title in order to pursue a trilogy match with Román González. On August 11, 2022, Estrada officially relinquished the super flyweight "Super" title. Immediately afterwards, Franco was promoted to undisputed status and remained the sanctioning body's sole titleholder at junior bantamweight.

Franco vs. Ioka
On October 11, 2022, it was revealed that Franco has entered into negotiations for a title unification fight with the reigning WBO super flyweight champion Kazuto Ioka. It was confirmed a month later that the title bout would take place on New Year's Eve at the Ota City General Gymnasium in Tokyo, Japan. On November 4, the WBO furthermore ordered the winner of the fight to face the sanctioning body's former flyweight champion Junto Nakatani in a mandatory title defense no later than 180 days afterwards. The fight ended in a majority decision draw. One judge scored it 115–113 for Franco, while the remaining two judges scored it as a 114–114 draw.

Professional boxing record

See also
List of world super-flyweight boxing champions
List of Mexican boxing world champions

References

External links

Living people
1995 births
American male boxers
Boxers from Texas
Sportspeople from San Antonio
Super-flyweight boxers
Bantamweight boxers
World Boxing Association champions
World super-flyweight boxing champions